In Lucian of Samosata's works, Myia is a young girl who fell in love with Endymion and was transformed by the lunar goddess Selene into a fly, a small insect bearing her name.

Etymology 
The ancient Greek noun  translates to 'fly', and is derived from the Proto-Indo-European root *mus-ih2, thus being cognate with the Latin musca.

Mythology 
In his satirical work Praising a Fly, Lucian of Samosata related the–otherwise unattested–myth of Myia, an exceedingly fair but also very chatty maiden who fell in love with Endymion, a very handsome mortal man who had been granted immortality via eternal slumber. With her endless chatter Myia would wake up Endymion, irritating him and enraging the moon goddess Selene, his lover. Selene then transformed the talkative girl into a fly, who annoys sleeping people to this day, in memory of her love and her deeds in her previous life.

See also 

 Psalacantha
 Clytie
 Io
 Cerambus

Notes

References 
 
 
  Online version at Perseus.tufts project.
 
 Lucian, The Fly in Phalaris. Hippias or The Bath. Dionysus. Heracles. Amber or The Swans. The Fly. Nigrinus. Demonax. The Hall. My Native Land. Octogenarians. A True Story. Slander. The Consonants at Law. The Carousal (Symposium) or The Lapiths. Translated by A. M. Harmon. Loeb Classical Library 14. Cambridge, MA: Harvard University Press, 1913.
 

Selene
Metamorphoses into arthropods in Greek mythology
Women in Greek mythology
Mythological insects